John Richard Jeremy Burnham (28 May 1931 – 31 December 2020) was a British television actor of the 1960s and 1970s, and a screenwriter.

Life and career
Burnham began in the 1950s as an actor and appeared in many popular British TV series such as The Avengers episodes "The Fear Merchants", "The Town of No Return", and "The Forget-Me-Knot", The Saint and Randall and Hopkirk (Deceased) in 1969.

In the mid-1970s he retired from acting and concentrated on screenwriting. With Trevor Ray, he co-authored the fondly-remembered children's science fiction horror serial Children of the Stones (1977). A novelization followed, also in 1977. A sequel novel, Return to the Stones appeared in 2012 as an e-book and in 2015 as a physical book. Ray and Burnham collaborated on a less well-known children's five episode serial entitled Raven (1977); they also wrote the novelization (1977).

He also authored the children's tennis-based novel, Break Point, which was made into a BBC television series in 1982. Burnham himself played the leading role of tennis coach Frank Abbott.

Burnham also wrote for The Avengers, in which he had also appeared as an actor (see entry above), Minder and Peak Practice.

He died in December 2020 at the age of 89.

Selected acting credits
 The Birthday Present (1957)
 Yangtse Incident: The Story of H.M.S. Amethyst (1957)
 The Good Companions (1957) 
 Bonjour Tristesse (1958) 
 Law and Disorder (1958)
 Bachelor of Hearts (1958)
 Upstairs and Downstairs (1959)
 I Could Go On Singing (1963)
 Torpedo Bay (1963)
 The System (1964)
 The Brigand of Kandahar (1965)

References

External links

1931 births
2020 deaths
20th-century English novelists
21st-century English novelists
English male film actors
English male novelists
English male screenwriters
English male television actors
English screenwriters